The 2014–15 Hawaii Rainbow Wahine women's basketball team represented the University of Hawaii at Manoa during the 2014–15 NCAA Division I women's basketball season. The Wahine, led by third-year head coach Laura Beeman, played their home games at the Stan Sheriff Center as members of the Big West Conference. They finished the season 23–9, including 14–2 in Big West play to finish in first place. Hawaii lost the Big West tournament final to Cal State Northridge. However, by winning a conference regular season title, Hawaii earned an automatic bid to the WNIT. Hawaii lost the first round of the WNIT to Saint Mary's.

Previous season
The Wahine finished the 2014–15 season 23–9 (14–2 Big West), good for first place in the conference. After losing the championship round of the Big West tournament, Hawaii earned an automatic bid to the WNIT by virtue of winning its regular season conference title and lost in the first round.

Roster

Schedule
Sources:

|-
!colspan=9 style="background:#024731; color:#FFFFFF;"| Exhibition

|-
!colspan=9 style="background:#024731; color:#FFFFFF;"| Non-conference regular season

|-
!colspan=9 style="background:#024731; color:#FFFFFF;"| Big West regular season

|-
!colspan=9 style="background:#024731; color:#FFFFFF;"| Big West tournament
 
 
|-
!colspan=9 style="background:#024731; color:#FFFFFF;"| Women's National Invitation Tournament

See also
2014–15 Hawaii Rainbow Warriors basketball team

References

Hawaii Rainbow Wahine basketball seasons
Hawaii
2014 in sports in Hawaii
2015 in sports in Hawaii